Yachanahalli Adinarayanappa Narayanaswamy (born 22 December 1964) is an Indian politician belonging to the Bharatiya Janata Party. He was earlier elected as a member of Legislative Assembly from Hebbal after death of incumbent MLA Jagadish Kumar and later contested unsuccessfully from same seat in 2018.

References

1964 births
Living people
Karnataka MLAs 2013–2018
Bharatiya Janata Party politicians from Karnataka